Ente Radio Trieste was the public service radio broadcaster of the Free Territory of Trieste.

It was established by the Allied Military Government for Occupied Territories in 1947, during Allied Military Government administration over Zone A of Free Territory of Trieste, and ceased, de facto, on 1 July 1955, eight months after Italian Government extended civil administration over Zone A of Free Territory of Trieste and the Free Territory of Trieste ceased, de facto, to exist.

References
 Radio Trieste - IBS

Radio stations established in 1945
Radio stations disestablished in 1955
Free Territory of Trieste